William Wallace Irwin (1803September 15, 1856) was Mayor of Pittsburgh and a Whig  member of the U.S. House of Representatives from Pennsylvania.

Early life
William Irwin was born in Pittsburgh in 1803, and as a boy earned the lifelong nickname "pony Irwin" because of his habit of riding a pony everywhere he went.  He graduated from the Western University of Pennsylvania, now known as the University of Pittsburgh, in 1824. He was also a graduate of Allegheny College.  He became a member of the Allegheny County bar on May 6, 1828, and by 1835 was serving as the president of the Western University's alumni association. He ran successfully for Allegheny County District Attorney in 1838.

Marriage and family

Irwins first wife was Frances Everallyn Rose Irwin (April 1809–February 24, 1836), the niece of Illinois Supreme Court justice Theophilus W. Smith and aunt of bridge engineer Charles Shaler Smith. They were the parents of United States Navy Rear Admiral John Irwin (1832-1901).

After his first wifes death, Irwin married again on February 28, 1839 in Philadelphia, Pennsylvania. His second wife was Sophia Arabella Bache, born November 14, 1815 at Philadelphia, Pennsylvania, and died on March 24, 1904. She was the daughter of Richard Bache, Jr., who served in the Republic of Texas Navy and was elected as a Representative to the Second Texas Legislature in 1847, and Sophia Burrell Dallas, the daughter of Arabella Maria Smith and Alexander J. Dallas, an American statesman who served as the U.S. Treasury Secretary under President James Madison.  She was also granddaughter of Sarah Franklin Bache and Richard Bache, the great-granddaughter of Benjamin Franklin, and a niece of George Mifflin Dallas, the 11th Vice President of the United States, serving under James K. Polk.

Irwin had two children with Bache: educator Agnes Irwin and American businessman and the Kingdom of Hawaii's Minister to Japan, Robert Walker Irwin.

Pittsburgh politics
Upon being elected mayor in 1840 Irwin oversaw the expansion of infrastructure and government in the city to catch up with the regions rapid expansion.  Under his administration four additional wards were added to the city.

United States House of Representatives
Irwin used his term as mayor as a touchstone for his race as a representative for U.S. Congress.  He was elected as a Whig to the Twenty-seventh Congress.  He was not a candidate for reelection in 1842.

Later life
After his term in Congress, Irwin was United States Ambassador to Denmark 1843-1847. He died in Pittsburgh in 1856. Interment in Allegheny Cemetery.

References

External links

The Mayors of Pittsburgh
The Political Graveyard

1803 births
1856 deaths
Mayors of Pittsburgh
Ambassadors of the United States to Denmark
Franklin family
19th-century American diplomats
University of Pittsburgh alumni
Whig Party members of the United States House of Representatives from Pennsylvania
Burials at Allegheny Cemetery
19th-century American politicians